Emerik Feješ (Osijek, November 3, 1904 – Novi Sad, July 9, 1969) was a painter; a classic of Serbian Naïve art.

Biography 
He was born in Osijek in 1904 in the Croatia-Slavonia (Kingdom of Hungary, Austria-Hungary, from 1918 part of the Serb-Croat-Slovene Kingdom) to a poor family of mixed Hungarian-Serbian heritage (original surname of his family was Stefanović / Стефановић). At the age of five he moved to Serbia with his parents and spent his life in Novi Sad, where he began to paint in 1949 after his serious illness and retiring. Between two world wars he worked as a button-maker, second-hand dealer, comb-maker, shop assistant and lathe operator in various towns of former Yugoslavia. During World War II he lived in exile, in Hungary, and in 1945 he returned to Novi Sad. Feješ suffered from asthma and sciatica throughout his life, keeping him bed-ridden. In 1949, he discovered painting and handicrafts, and began his first works.
In 1969 Feješ died in Novi Sad, leaving behind many buttons and combs, and hundreds of pictures that are much admired for their lack of inhibition and universal appeal.

Artistic Style 
He began to paint nudes, portraits, still life and genre scenes from suburban life; from 1954 he exclusively painted urban scenes. He had his first exhibition in 1955 and independent show in 1956. He was a protagonist of urban landscape in naïve art and outsider art in the South–Slavic region. Despite his great freedom in presentation and stylization, his compositions did not exceed the domain of the explicit and the recognizable, because he took black and white postcards with monumental buildings as models, and copied them by using carbon paper, then magnified them, always adding something from his fantasy. Realistic appearance and coloring of buildings were subordinated to the artist's fancy, sometimes not the least like original. He painted the towns at the Adriatic Coast, the North Sea, England, Germany, the Netherlands, Switzerland, France, India, etc. Defining the arches and architraves by use of frieze of dominoes, scattered buttons instead of oculi the artist showed his lucidity. With his irresistible wish to make the reality more beautiful, to make the grey colourful, he uses warm, sound and fauvist bright tints. The absence of narration, i.e. the abstract forms, coloring, inclination to the geometrical, strong rhythm and stylization in the presentation, flatness and ornamentation point to instinctively conceived modern sensibility of Emerik Feješ. A figure did not interest him much, but the dance of tiles, specific boogie-woogie, by which he made unique, cheerful scenery, rhapsodies of shapes and colours, behind which he used to hide, lonely, ill and fragile like a small, grey screw in the machinery of mainstream which devours everything. He lived in his own world of infantile game of colours and lines in the ambience of everlasting childhood. He was not considerably prominent during his lifetime. His art was recognized by the audience many years later. He is a world classic today.

Exhibitions 
He exhibited his urban legends worldwide and many times received awards and recognition. The greatest and most representative collections of his works are in Museum of Naïve and Marginal Art (MNMA), Jagodina, Serbia, in Croatian Museum of Naïve Art, Zagreb, Gallery Elke und Werner Zimmer, Düsseldorf; and Galerie Charlotte Zande Bönningheim, Germany, etc.

Gallery

References

Literature 

 М.Бошковић; М.Маширевић,Самоуки ликовни уметници у Србији, Торино, 1977
 Ото Бихаљи-Мерин; Небојша Бато Томашевић, Енциклопедија наивне уметности света, Београд, 1984
 Н. Крстић, Наивна уметност Србије, САНУ, MNMA, Jagodina, 2003
 Н. Крстић, Наивна и маргинална уметност Србије, MNMA, Jagodina, 2007
 N. Krstić, Outsiders, catalogue, MNMA, Jagodina, 2013
 Н. Крстић, Бајка о градовима, монографија, MNMA, Jagodina, 2014
 N. Krstić, Outsider Art in Serbia, MNMA, Јагодина, 2014, pp. 144–151

External links

 Emerik Feješ
 Emerik Feješ paintings, autobiography, photo

Outsider artists
Naïve painters
People from Osijek
Artists from Novi Sad
1904 births
1969 deaths
20th-century Serbian painters
Serbian male painters
20th-century Serbian male artists